In statistics, a pivotal quantity or pivot is a function of observations and unobservable parameters such that the function's probability distribution does not depend on the unknown parameters (including nuisance parameters). A pivot quantity need not be a statistic—the function and its value can depend on the parameters of the model, but its distribution must not. If it is a statistic, then it is known as an ancillary statistic.

More formally, let  be a random sample from a distribution that depends on a parameter (or vector of parameters) . Let  be a random variable whose distribution is the same for all . Then  is called a pivotal quantity (or simply a pivot).

Pivotal quantities are commonly used for normalization to allow data from different data sets to be compared. It is relatively easy to construct pivots for location and scale parameters: for the former we form differences so that location cancels, for the latter ratios so that scale cancels.

Pivotal quantities are fundamental to the construction of test statistics, as they allow the statistic to not depend on parameters – for example, Student's t-statistic is for a normal distribution with unknown variance (and mean). They also provide one method of constructing confidence intervals, and the use of pivotal quantities improves performance of the bootstrap. In the form of ancillary statistics, they can be used to construct frequentist prediction intervals (predictive confidence intervals).

Examples

Normal distribution 

One of the simplest pivotal quantities is the z-score; given a normal distribution with mean  and variance , and an observation x, the z-score:
 
has distribution  – a normal distribution with mean 0 and variance 1. Similarly, since the n-sample sample mean has sampling distribution  the z-score of the mean 
 
also has distribution  Note that while these functions depend on the parameters – and thus one can only compute them if the parameters are known (they are not statistics) – the distribution is independent of the parameters.

Given  independent, identically distributed (i.i.d.) observations  from the normal distribution with unknown mean  and variance , a pivotal quantity can be obtained from the function:

where 

and

The function  is the Student's t-statistic for a new value , to be drawn from the same population as the already observed set of values .

Using  the function  becomes a pivotal quantity, which is also distributed by the Student's t-distribution with  degrees of freedom.

This can be used to compute a prediction interval for the next observation  see Prediction interval: Normal distribution.

Bivariate normal distribution 
In more complicated cases, it is impossible to construct exact pivots. However, having approximate pivots improves convergence to asymptotic normality.

Suppose a sample of size  of vectors  is taken from a bivariate normal distribution with unknown correlation . 

The sample statistic  has an asymptotically normal distribution:
.

However, a variance-stabilizing transformation

known as Fisher's z transformation of the correlation coefficient allows creating the distribution of  asymptotically independent of unknown parameters:

where  is the corresponding distribution parameter. An even closer approximation to the standard normal distribution is obtained by using a better approximation for the exact variance: the usual form is

Robustness 

From the point of view of robust statistics, pivotal quantities are robust to changes in the parameters – indeed, independent of the parameters – but not in general robust to changes in the model, such as violations of the assumption of normality.
This is fundamental to the robust critique of non-robust statistics, often derived from pivotal quantities: such statistics may be robust within the family, but are not robust outside it.

See also 
 Normalization (statistics)

References 

Statistical theory